Two ships of the Royal Australian Navy have been named HMAS Tarakan after the town of Tarakan in Borneo and the Allied recapture of this town in 1945.

, a Mark III tank landing ship commissioned in 1946 and serving until 1954, when she was sold for scrap
, a Balikpapan-class heavy landing craft laid down in 1971, and decommissioned in 2014

Battle honours
Ships named HMAS Tarakan are entitled to carry a single battle honour:
East Timor 1999–2000

References

Royal Australian Navy ship names